Francisco Duran may refer to:

 Francisco Manuel Durán (born 1988), Spanish footballer
 Francisco Martin Duran (born 1968), who attempted to assassinate Bill Clinton
 Francisco Durán (weightlifter) (born 1984), Dominican Republic weightlifter
 Dr. Francisco Duran, American educator and school administrator